"The Time Has Come" is a song written by Susan Longacre and Lonnie Wilson, and recorded by American country music artist Martina McBride.  It was released in May 1992 as her debut single and taken from her debut studio album of the same name.  The song reached number 23 on the Billboard Hot Country Singles & Tracks chart.

Music video
The music video was directed by Kate Ryan.

Track listing
"The Time Has Come" – 2:32
"The Rope" – 3:58

Chart performance

References

1992 debut singles
1992 songs
Martina McBride songs
Song recordings produced by Paul Worley
RCA Records Nashville singles
Songs written by Susan Longacre
Songs written by Lonnie Wilson